Lygistus is a genus of leaf beetles in the family Chrysomelidae. There is one described species in Lygistus, Lygistus streptophallus.

References

Further reading

 
 
 
 

Galerucinae
Chrysomelidae genera
Articles created by Qbugbot
Monotypic beetle genera